Dustin Anthony Osborn (born March 26, 1984) is a former American football player.

Early life
Osborn grew up in La Junta, Colorado. He is the son of Mary Jo Osborn and Jim Osborn. Has two brothers.

High School years
Osborn attended La Junta High School in La Junta, Colorado, and was a two-time football varsity letter award winner. He also earned three basketball letter awards and four in track.

College football career
Osborn was a wide receiver, kick returner, and punt returner for the Colorado State Rams. He majored in business administration. He was red-shirted after joining the team as a walk-on in 2003. He played four years for Colorado State and entered the 2007 NFL Draft as a senior.

Career statistics

Receiving

Pro football career
Osborn did not get drafted in the NFL Draft, but was signed by the New York Jets as an undrafted free agent on April 30, 2007. Terms of the deal were not disclosed. Osborn was released on May 15, 2007.

References

External links 
http://www.nfl.com/

1984 births
American football return specialists
American football wide receivers
Colorado State Rams football players
Living people
People from La Junta, Colorado

ja:ジェレミー・ブルーム